Phillip E. Johnson (June 18, 1940 – November 2, 2019) was a UC Berkeley law professor, opponent of evolutionary science, co-founder of the pseudoscientific intelligent design movement, author of the "Wedge strategy" and co-founder of the Discovery Institute's Center for Science and Culture (CSC) . He described himself as "in a sense the father of the intelligent design movement". He was a critic of Darwinism, which he described as "fully naturalistic evolution, involving chance mechanisms and natural selection".  The wedge strategy aims to change public opinion and scientific consensus, and seeks to convince the scientific community to allow a role for theism, or causes beyond naturalistic explanation, in scientific discourse.  Johnson argued that scientists accepted the theory of evolution "before it was rigorously tested, and thereafter used all their authority to convince the public that naturalistic processes are sufficient to produce a human from a bacterium, and a bacterium from a mix of chemicals."

The scientific community considers Johnson's defense of intelligent design to be pseudoscientific.

Biography
Johnson was born in Aurora, Illinois, in 1940. He received a BA degree in English literature, from Harvard University in 1961. He studied law at the University of Chicago, graduating top of his class, and received a Juris Doctor in 1965. He served as a law clerk for the Chief Justice of the U.S. Supreme Court Earl Warren and Chief Justice of the California Supreme Court Roger J. Traynor. Johnson became a member of the California Bar in January 1966. From 1967 to 2000, Johnson was an active professor of law at the U.C. Berkeley School of Law and retained the title professor emeritus at the time of his death. Johnson served as deputy district attorney and held visiting professorships at Emory University and at University College London.

At the age of 38, Johnson became a born again Christian following a divorce, and later became an elder in the Presbyterian Church (U.S.A.). Johnson recounted that on sabbatical in England he sought, through prayer, inspiration for what he should do with the rest of his life, and then received an epiphany after he read Richard Dawkins' The Blind Watchmaker (1986) and Michael Denton's Evolution: A Theory in Crisis (1985). Johnson later said, "Something about the Darwinists' rhetorical style made me think they had something to hide." Despite having no formal background in biology, he felt that he could add insight into the premises and arguments.  Johnson stated that he approached the creation evolution dispute not as a scientist but as an academic lawyer by profession, with a specialty in analyzing the logic of arguments and identifying the assumptions that lie behind those arguments. He noted that what people think about evolutionism depends very heavily on the kind of logic they employ and the kind of assumptions they make. Further, he pointed out that four of the eleven members of the special committee appointed by the National Academy of Sciences to prepare its official booklet titled Science and Creationism were lawyers. (That first edition of the publication, which was finished in 1984, was prepared as an amicus brief in the Edwards v. Aguillard case that went before the U.S. Supreme Court.) In 1989 Of Pandas and People by Percival Davis and Dean H. Kenyon was published as the first book to promote intelligent design.

The first edition of Darwin on Trial was published in 1991. In notes listing his sources, Johnson said about Of Pandas and People that "This book is 'creationist' only in the sense that it juxtaposes a paradigm of 'intelligent design' with the dominant paradigm of (naturalistic) evolution, and makes the case for the former. It does not rely on the authority of the Bible." Following that, Johnson sought supporters for his "Wedge Strategy".
In the ID blog Evolution News, Casey Luskin described him as Godfather of the intelligent design movement, PBS said he was "known as the father of intelligent design". He is a critic of methodological naturalism (the basic principle that science can only investigate natural causes for observable phenomena), and espouses a philosophy he has coined "theistic realism." He is the author of several books on intelligent design, science, philosophy, and religion, as well as textbooks on criminal law. He has appeared on various programs such as PBS's Firing Line and a Nova episode, "Judgment Day: Intelligent Design on Trial."

Since 2001, Johnson had suffered a series of minor right brain strokes. His rehabilitations limited his public activities and participation in the debate on intelligent design, because of both their physical effects and Johnson's belief that they were signs from God urging him to spend more time with his faith and family and less in prideful debate. In 2004, he was awarded the inaugural "Phillip E. Johnson Award for Liberty and Truth" by Biola University, a private evangelical Christian college noted for its promotion of intelligent design. Johnson had two children and lived with his wife in Berkeley, California.

Johnson stated in an interview that he believed "the strength of America is not in its towers or in its battleships, it's in its faith. Of course, I said that, but I wasn't sure it was really true anymore.  This isn't the same country we were in the previous decades." Johnson said the U.S. was "cringing in fear" of Muslim terrorists after September 11 attacks and that professors were afraid to discuss it "because they're afraid of what the Muslim students will do. They're afraid it won't keep the peace on campus. I never thought our country would descend to this level. We are afraid to search the truth and to proclaim it.  We once knew who the true God was and were able to proclaim it frankly.  But since about 1960 we've been hiding from that. We've been trying to pretend that all religions are the same."

Death
He died in early November 2019 at his home.

Intelligent design

Johnson is best known as one of the founders of the intelligent design movement, principal architect of the wedge strategy, author of the Santorum Amendment, and one of the ID movement's most prolific authors. Johnson is co-founder and program advisor of the Discovery Institute's Center for Science and Culture. Johnson has advocated strongly in the public and political spheres for the teaching of intelligent design as preferable to the teaching of evolution, which Johnson characterizes as "atheistic" and "falsified by all of the evidence" and whose "logic is terrible." In portraying the philosophy of science, and by extension its theories such as evolution as atheistic, Johnson argues that a more valid alternative is "theistic realism." Theistic realism asserts that science, by relying upon methodological naturalism, demands an a priori adoption of a naturalistic philosophy that wrongly dismisses out of hand any explanation that contains a supernatural cause.

Johnson rejects common descent and does not take a position on the age of the Earth. These concepts are a common theme in his books, including Darwin on Trial, Reason in the Balance: The Case Against Naturalism in Science, Law & Education (1995), Defeating Darwinism by Opening Minds (1997), and The Wedge of Truth: Splitting the Foundations of Naturalism (2000). Eugenie Scott wrote that Darwin on Trial "teaches little that is accurate about either the nature of science, or the topic of evolution. It is recommended neither by scientists nor educators." Working through the Center for Science and Culture Johnson wrote the early draft language of the Santorum Amendment, which encouraged a "Teach the Controversy" approach to evolution in public school education.

Nancy Pearcey, a Center for Science and Culture fellow and Johnson associate, credits Johnson's leadership of the intelligent design movement in two of her most recent publications. In an interview with Johnson for World magazine, Pearcey says, "It is not only in politics that leaders forge movements. Phillip Johnson has developed what is called the 'Intelligent Design' movement ..." In Christianity Today, she reveals Johnson's religious beliefs and his criticism of evolution and affirms Johnson as "The unofficial spokesman for ID" The scientific community views intelligent design as unscientific, pseudoscience and junk science.

Darwin on Trial 

In the book Darwin on Trial, 1991, Johnson disputed the tenets of evolution and promoted Intelligent design.  He wrote the book with the thesis that evolution could be "tried" like a defendant in court. Darwin on Trial became a central text of the intelligent design movement.

Wedge strategy

In its earliest days the intelligent design movement was called the 'wedge movement'. The wedge metaphor, attributed to Johnson, is that of a metal wedge splitting a log and represents using an aggressive public relations program to create an opening for the supernatural in the public's understanding of science. Johnson acknowledges that the goal of the intelligent design movement is to promote a theistic agenda as a scientific concept.

According to Johnson, the wedge movement, if not the term, began in 1992:

Johnson describes the wedge movement as devoted to a "program of questioning the materialistic basis of science" and reclaiming the "intellectual world" from the "atheists and agnostics" that Johnson believes are synonymous with this "scientific materialist culture." He describes the "logic of our movement" as:
"The first thing you understand is that the Darwinian theory isn't true. It's falsified by all of the evidence, and the logic is terrible."
"...the next question that occurs to you is, 'Well, where might you get truth?' ... I start with John 1:1, 'In the beginning was the Word.' In the beginning was intelligence, purpose, and wisdom. The Bible had that right and the materialist scientists are deluding themselves."
"The next question is: Why do so many brilliant, well-informed, intelligent people fool themselves for so long with such bad thinking and bad evidence?" Johnson sees this as an issue of "turning away from" self-evident truth, the "sin question" and the need to prepare the way for acceptance of a Creator.

Johnson has been explicit about the Christian principles underlying his philosophy and agenda and that of the intelligent design movement. In speaking at the 1999 "Reclaiming America for Christ Conference," Johnson has described the movement thus:

Rob Boston of Americans United for Separation of Church and State described this vision as:

Johnson is one of the authors of the Discovery Institute's Wedge Document and its "Teach the Controversy" campaign, which attempts to cast doubt on the validity of the theory of evolution, its acceptance within the scientific community, and reduce its role in public school science curricula while promoting intelligent design. The "Teach the Controversy" campaign portrays evolution as "a theory in crisis."

In his 1997 book Defeating Darwinism by Opening Minds Johnson summed up the underlying philosophy of his advocacy for intelligent design and against methodological and philosophical naturalism:

Johnson has described the wedge strategy as:
"We are taking an intuition most people have [the belief in God] and making it a scientific and academic enterprise. We are removing the most important cultural roadblock to accepting the role of God as creator."
"Our strategy has been to change the subject a bit, so that we can get the issue of intelligent design, which really means the reality of God, before the academic world and into the schools."
"This isn't really, and never has been, a debate about science. It's about religion and philosophy."
"So the question is: 'How to win?' That's when I began to develop what you now see full-fledged in the 'wedge' strategy: 'Stick with the most important thing' —the mechanism and the building up of information. Get the Bible and the Book of Genesis out of the debate because you do not want to raise the so-called Bible-science dichotomy. Phrase the argument in such a way that you can get it heard in the secular academy and in a way that tends to unify the religious dissenters. That means concentrating on, 'Do you need a Creator to do the creating, or can nature do it on its own?' and refusing to get sidetracked onto other issues, which people are always trying to do."

When asked how best to raise doubts and question evolution with non-believers, Johnson responded:

Wedge of Truth

The book Wedge of Truth, published by Johnson in 2000, is an expansion of the Wedge Document. He states that truth has the ability to speak for itself.

Criticism
Johnson has been accused of being intellectually dishonest in his arguments advancing intelligent design and attacking the scientific community. Johnson has employed numerous equivocations regarding the term "naturalism," failing to distinguish between methodological naturalism (in which science is used to study the natural world and says nothing about the supernatural) versus philosophical naturalism (the philosophical belief that nothing exists but the natural world, and adopts as a premise the idea that there is no supernatural world or deities). In fact-checking Johnson's books Darwin on Trial and Defeating Darwinism by Opening Minds, Brian Spitzer, an associate professor of biology at the University of Redlands, argued that almost every scientific source Johnson cited had been misused or distorted, from simple misinterpretations and innuendos to outright fabrications. Spitzer described Darwin on Trial as the most deceptive book he had ever read.

In 1993 the ASA's Perspectives on Science and Christian Faith published a review of Darwin on Trial by Nancey Murphy, an associate professor of Christian philosophy at Fuller Theological Seminary, who described Johnson's arguments as "dogmatic and unconvincing", primarily because "he does not adequately understand scientific reasoning."
In a later interview she said she faced a campaign to get her fired after she expressed her view that intelligent design was not only poor theology, but "so stupid, I don't want to give them my time." Murphy, who accepts the validity of evolution, said that Johnson called a trustee in an attempt to get her fired and stated "His tactic has always been to fight dirty when anyone attacks his ideas." Johnson admits he had spoken with a former trustee of the seminary who was himself upset with Murphy, but denies any responsibility for action taken against her. He said: "It's the Darwinists who hold the power in academia and who threaten the professional status and livelihoods of anyone who disagrees ... They feel to teach anything but their orthodoxy is an act of professional treason."

Since Johnson is considered by those both inside and outside the movement to be the father and architect of the intelligent design movement and its strategies, his statements are often used to validate the criticisms leveled by those who allege that the Discovery Institute and its allied organizations are merely stripping the obvious religious content from their anti-evolution assertions as a means of avoiding the legal restrictions of the Establishment Clause, a view reinforced by the December 2005 ruling in the Kitzmiller v. Dover Area School District trial which found that intelligent design is not science and is essentially religious in nature. They argue that ID is an attempt to put a patina of secularity on top of what is a fundamentally religious belief and thus that the "Teach the Controversy" exhortation is disingenuous, particularly when contrasted to his statements in The Wall Street Journal and other secular media. Critics point out that contrary to the Discovery Institute's and Johnson's claims, the theory of evolution is well-supported and accepted within the scientific community, with debates regarding how evolution occurred, not if it occurred. Popular disagreement with evolutionary theory should not be considered as a reason for challenging it as a scientifically valid subject to be taught, they contend.

Critics of Johnson point to his central role in the Discovery Institute's carefully orchestrated campaign known as the wedge strategy. The wedge strategy, as envisioned by the Discovery Institute, is designed to leave the science establishment looking close-minded in the short term with a long-term goal being a redefinition of science that centers on the removal of methodological naturalism from the philosophy of science and the scientific method, thereby allowing for supernatural explanations to be introduced as science. Critics note that Johnson, as a principal officer of the Discovery Institute, often cites an overall plan to put the United States on a course toward the theocracy envisioned in the wedge strategy, and that the Discovery Institute as a matter of policy intentionally obfuscates its agenda. According to Johnson, "The movement we now call the wedge made its public debut at a conference of scientists and philosophers held at Southern Methodist University in March 1992."

During the 1990s, Johnson and several others challenged the scientific consensus by claiming that HIV tests do not detect HIV, AIDS statistics are grossly exaggerated, and that HIV is not the cause of AIDS. As a member of The Group for the Scientific Reappraisal of the HIV/AIDS Hypothesis, a prominent AIDS denialist group, Johnson questioned if HIV caused AIDS. He wrote several articles about the subject, including a piece in Reason magazine. He was one of the 12 founding members of The Group for the Scientific Reappraisal of the HIV/AIDS Hypothesis and signatory to the group's letter to the editor of Science asserting that HIV is only tautologically associated with AIDS and that HIV tests are inaccurate. Johnson, along with others, have been criticized for their questioning of the scientific and medical consensus that HIV causes AIDS. In the Washington University Law Review, Matthew J. Brauer, Barbara Forrest, and Steven G. Gey faulted Johnson, Wells and others for denying the HIV/AIDS connection and promoting denialism via a petition designed to garner publicity but which did not have any scientific support.

Admission that there is no theory of intelligent design

In his later years Johnson retreated from his contention that intelligent design was a scientific theory. In an interview in 2006 he described it as follows:I also don’t think that there is really a theory of intelligent design at the present time to propose as a comparable alternative to the Darwinian theory, which is, whatever errors it might contain, a fully worked out scheme. There is no intelligent design theory that’s comparable. Working out a positive theory is the job of the scientific people that we have affiliated with the movement. Some of them are quite convinced that it’s doable, but that’s for them to prove…No product is ready for competition in the educational world.

Bibliography

Criminal law

Darwinism

See also 
 List of law clerks of the Supreme Court of the United States (Chief Justice)

Notes

References

External links 

 Articles by Phillip E. Johnson in Touchstone Magazine: A Journal of Mere Christianity, a bimonthly Christian publication
 The Religion of the Blind Watchmaker 
 "Origin of the Specious" – an article by Ronald Bailey, published in the July 1997 issued of Reason magazine, concerns the development of intelligent design
 Johnson's writings on HIV and AIDS at the VirusMyth website
 "Phillip Johnson: From Crackpot to Dangerously Insane Crackpot" by Kevin T. Keith at the Lean Left blog
 Critiques of Phillip Johnson by Jim Lippard and Bill Hamilton at the TalkOrigins Archive
 "The Terrible Strength and Weakness of Naturalism" – an interview of Phillip E. Johnson with Tal Brooke. SCP Journal. Vol. 21:4–22:1. Spring 1998. 

1940 births
2019 deaths
People from Aurora, Illinois
Writers from Berkeley, California
Writers from Illinois
California lawyers
Law clerks of the Supreme Court of the United States
Discovery Institute fellows and advisors
Intelligent design advocates
HIV/AIDS denialists
American non-fiction writers
UC Berkeley School of Law faculty
University of Chicago Law School alumni
Harvard University alumni
20th-century American lawyers